Anthony Chubb (28 February 1915 – 15 September 2007) was a South African cricketer. He played in two first-class matches for Border in 1947/48.

See also
 List of Border representative cricketers

References

External links
 

1915 births
2007 deaths
South African cricketers
Border cricketers
Cricketers from East London, Eastern Cape